Isabel Waidacher (born 25 July 1994) is a Swiss ice hockey player for Djurgårdens IF Hockey and the Swiss national team.

Playing career
She participated at the 2017 IIHF Women's World Championship.

Personal life
Her sisters Monika Waidacher and Nina Waidacher are also hockey players.

References

External links

1994 births
Living people
Swiss women's ice hockey forwards
Olympic ice hockey players of Switzerland
Ice hockey players at the 2018 Winter Olympics
College of St. Scholastica alumni
Swiss expatriate ice hockey people
Swiss expatriate sportspeople in the United States
Swiss expatriate sportspeople in Sweden
Djurgårdens IF Hockey Dam players